The Deep Set is the ninth album by New Zealand band The Bats, released in 2017.

Recording and release
In December 2015, The Bats recorded tracks for the album at Sitting Room studios in Lyttelton, New Zealand. The album was recorded and co-produced by Ben Edwards.

The album was released on January 27, 2017 with the label Flying Nun.

Track listing

Personnel
Malcolm Grant - drums
Paul Kean - backing vocals, bass
Robert Scott - vocals, guitar, keyboards
Kaye Woodward - vocals, guitar

Also credited:
Ben Edwards - engineer, co-producer

References

The Bats (New Zealand band) albums
Flying Nun Records albums
Dunedin Sound albums